Sir Denny Ashburnham, 1st Baronet (c.1628 – 11 December 1697) was an English landowner and politician who sat in the House of Commons at various times between 1660 and 1689.

Background
Ashburnham was the eldest son of Lawrence Ashburnham of Broomham Park, Guestling, Sussex, and his second wife, Bridget Fleetwood, daughter of Sir George Fleetwood. His paternal grandfather was Adam Ashburnham, who sat in the Parliament of England.

Career

Ashburnham was a Commissioner for the Militia and became  a Justice of the Peace for Sussex in March 1660. In April 1660, he was elected Member of Parliament (MP) for Hastings in the Convention Parliament. He was re-elected MP for Hastings in 1661 for the Cavalier Parliament. On 15 May 1661, he was created a baronet, of Bromham, in the County of Sussex. In 1665, Ashburnham was appointed a Commissioner of the Excise, a post he held for the next three years and again from 1688 until 1689.  He became a Deputy Lieutenant for Sussex in 1670. He was a Victualler of the Navy in 1671 and also between 1673 and 1677. Ashburnham was several times a Commissioner for Assessment and between 1683 and 1689 served as Commissioner for Hearth-tax. In 1685, he was nominated mayor of Hastings.

In the aftermath of the so-called Popish Plot, Ashburnham was summoned in the trial of Titus Oates as a witness.

Ashburnham died at the age of about 68 and was buried at Guestling on 11 December 1697.

Family
Ashburnham married firstly Frances Ashburnham, daughter of John Ashburnham and aunt of John Ashburnham, 1st Baron Ashburnham. After her death, he married Anne Watkins, daughter of Sir David Watkins on 14 September 1675. He had four sons and two daughters by his first wife and three sons and one daughter by his second wife. Ashburnham was buried at Guestling in Sussex and was succeeded in the baronetcy by his sons William and Charles successively.

Arms

References

1697 deaths
Baronets in the Baronetage of England
People from Guestling
Year of birth uncertain
English MPs 1660
English MPs 1661–1679
English MPs 1685–1687